Center Township is a township in Cloud County, Kansas, USA.  As of the 2000 census, its population was 172.

History
Center Township was organized in 1873. It was named from its position at the geographical center of Cloud County.

Geography
According to the USGS, it contains four cemeteries: Enterprise, Hall, Kindel and Pleasant Hill.

The stream of East Branch Oak Creek runs through this township.

References

 USGS Geographic Names Information System (GNIS)

External links
 City-Data.com

Townships in Cloud County, Kansas
Townships in Kansas